Gabriele Geißler (later Orgis, 1 November 1944 – 14 June 2006), was a female East German international table tennis player.

She won a silver medal at the 1969 World Table Tennis Championships in the women's singles. Between 1963 and 1980 she was nine times East German national champion.

See also
 List of table tennis players
 List of World Table Tennis Championships medalists

References

1944 births
2006 deaths
German female table tennis players
Sportspeople from Dresden
World Table Tennis Championships medalists